John McCloskey (1810-1885) was an American Roman Catholic clergyman and first American Cardinal.

John McCloskey may also refer to:
 Henry John McCloskey (1925-2000), Australian moral philosopher
 John McCloskey (baseball manager) (1862-1940), American baseball manager
 John McCloskey (pitcher) (1882-1919), American baseball pitcher
 C. John McCloskey, Catholic priest